Trade Promotion Management (TPM) is a software application that assist companies in managing their trade promotion activity.

Gartner 
Gartner Company believes that technologies related to managing trade promotions havebecome more relevant, as the average revenue expended by manufacturers for promotions now exceeds 20%. More and more companies are leaving spreadsheets for automated technologies, while others are adding promotion optimization capabilities.

Gartner published the Market Guide for Trade Promotion Management and Optimization for the Consumer Goods Industry in February 2017.

Key functions
 Sales Forecasting
 Promotion planning and budgeting
 Predictive modeling/optimization
 Promotion execution and monitoring
 Settlement
 Post event analysis

Business problems addressed
Commonly, companies use their accounting systems or spreadsheets to manage promotions.  As the complexity of trade increases software solutions have been developed for consumer goods, food manufacturing, food service and others.

Trade promotion decisions are often rushed and based on sub-par data. While sales and marketing managers are surrounded by promotion information, questions on retail commitment and product forecast accuracy can hinder the process. Multiple data sources and conflicting needs from various departments further complicate the issue.

Analytics
Historical trade promotion data should be analyzed in order to continually improve trade promotions. If a company does not utilize processes and systems that measure trade promotion performance, future trade promotion executions could be less effective than if they’d been planned using past analytical information.

Integration
Lack of integration both internally and with external partners can hinder trade promotion success. Key elements of organizational integration include

 standardized metrics, 
 regular information sharing, 
 cross-functional department collaboration, and 
 collaborative processes.

Integration with retail partners is important to executing promotions successfully, as well as maintain strong relationships with retailers over time.

Key performance indicators (KPI)
KPIs tell manufacturers and retailers how trade promotions performed relative to their pre-determined objectives. A lack of understanding on what trade promotion data to measure and how to measure performance can hinder the overall process. Manufacturers and retailers will not know what made a promotion effective or ineffective unless they have predetermined data points to measure and analyze.

References

Promotion and marketing communications